Liquid Tension Experiment 2 is the second studio album by the band Liquid Tension Experiment, released on June 15, 1999 through Magna Carta Records. The album reached No. 8 on the Billboard Top Internet Albums chart and No. 40 on Billboard'''s Heatseekers. It would take the band another 22 years before they would release their third album.

Overview
Each song is described by the band in detail within the liner notes. Bassist Tony Levin almost exclusively used a Chapman Stick to record the album's bass parts. The only bass guitar parts on the album occur briefly in "Another Dimension" and the intro to "Biaxident". The latter song takes its name from Biaxin, a medication that guitarist John Petrucci was taking during the recording sessions to combat severe headaches, making a pun on "by accident".

In the middle of the recording sessions, which took place between October and November 1998, Petrucci had to leave the studio when he got word that his pregnant wife had gone into labor. This left the other three band members to carry on recording by themselves. This is how "When the Water Breaks" got its name, as it was the song the band were working on when Petrucci got the news. The song contains a baby sound effect (a "baby soundscape", as described by keyboardist Jordan Rudess) at 12:48 to mark the particular section the band had been writing upon Petrucci's departure.

In Petrucci's absence Levin, Rudess and drummer Mike Portnoy recorded dozens of completely improvised jams, many of which would eventually be released on the 2007 album Spontaneous Combustion under the group name Liquid Trio Experiment. As such, "914" is the only song on the album which did not feature Petrucci. Portnoy alluded to the jams in the liner notes, stating that "if you dig this, there is A LOT more where it came from..."

When Petrucci returned to the studio in November, he wrote and recorded guitar parts for two of these improvisations: "Chewbacca" and "Liquid Dreams". For "Chewbacca" in particular, he took the time to learn several of Rudess's improvised melodies and doubled them on guitar, which in Portnoy's words "(gave) the illusion of written composition".

"Hourglass" is a duet between Petrucci and Rudess in the style of "State of Grace" from the band's first album. According to Petrucci it was written and recorded "in the wee hours with old strings".

"Acid Rain", the album's opening track, was the last song to be written and recorded by the whole band. For this song Petrucci used a seven-string guitar. A heavily shortened live version later appeared on Dream Theater's 2001 album Live Scenes from New York''. In this version the bass part is played by John Myung of Dream Theater on a six-string bass.

Track listing

Personnel

John Petrucci – guitar, producer
Tony Levin – Chapman Stick, bass guitar, producer
Jordan Rudess – keyboard, producer
Mike Portnoy – drums, percussion, producer
Chris Cubeta – engineering
Pat Thrall – engineering
Spyros Poulos – engineering
Kosaku Nakamura – engineering
Kevin Shirley – mixing
Rich Alvy – mixing assistance
Leon Zervos – mastering

Charts

References

External links
Liquid Tension Experiment "Liquid Tension Experiment 2" at Guitar Nine Records

1999 albums
Liquid Tension Experiment albums
Magna Carta Records albums